Gerald "Boomer" Wright is an American politician serving as a Republican member of the Oregon House of Representatives.

References 

Living people
Republican Party members of the Oregon House of Representatives
Year of birth missing (living people)